St Cross is a 19th-century residential domestic building in Llandaff, Cardiff, Wales. The building is a two-storey Grade II listed structure and it was listed because it is "Included as an unaltered design by Ewan Christian and for its group value with the other listed buildings around The Cathedral Green and on the High Street". The garden wall of St Cross is also a Grade II structure.

History

The building was built between 1859 and 1861 by Ewan Christian, who was the architect for the Ecclesiastical Commissioners. It is a right-hand house with its neighbour being St Andrew. Both semi-detached houses were built for minor canons of Llandaff Cathedral. It was built with multi-coloured stones, both square or rectangular in shape, and with Bath stone, ashlar dressings and Welsh slate roof.

Garden wall of St Cross

References

External links
 

Ewan Christian buildings
Grade II listed buildings in Cardiff
High Street, Llandaff